Lennard Maloney (born October 8, 1999) is a professional soccer player who plays as a center-back for German  club 1. FC Heidenheim. Born in Germany, he is a youth international for the United States.

Club career

Union Berlin 
Maloney spent 6 years in the youth academy of FC Union Berlin. In the 2017–18 Under 19 Bundesliga season, Maloney made 23 appearances for Union Berlin. On April 1, 2018, Maloney made his professional debut by starting in a 2. Bundesliga match against SpVgg Greuther Fürth.

Loan to Chemnitzer FC 
On January 31, 2020, Maloney was loaned out to Chemnitzer FC until the end of the 2019–20 season. His debut for Chemnitzer came on February 15 as he started against FC Magdeburg. He made eight appearances in total for Chemnitzer.

Borussia Dortmund II 
On August 7, 2020, Maloney joined Borussia Dortmund II on a free transfer.

He scored his first goal in a 2–0 win over SV Lippstadt 08 on March 20, 2021.

Borussia Dortmund 
On October 23, 2021, Maloney made his debut for Borussia Dortmund's senior team, coming on as a sub in the 88th minute in Dortmund's 3–1 win over Arminia Bielefeld.

1. FC Heidenheim 
On April 27, 2022, German media reported that he will join 1. FC Heidenheim on a free transfer from July 1. Maloney signed a three-year contract with the German second-division club.

International career
Maloney was capped by Germany youth national teams at under-18 and under-19 level in friendly matches. On July 7, 2018, Maloney accepted a call-up to the United States under-20 side and stated his desire to play for the United States. He earned his first two United States under-20 caps in friendlies against North Carolina FC and Tobacco Road FC.

Personal life
Maloney was born in Germany to an American father and German mother.

References

External links
 Profile on FuPa.net
 Profile on DFB.de

1999 births
Living people
Citizens of the United States through descent
American soccer players
United States men's under-20 international soccer players
German footballers
Chemnitzer FC players
1. FC Union Berlin players
Borussia Dortmund II players
Borussia Dortmund players
1. FC Heidenheim players
2. Bundesliga players
3. Liga players
Regionalliga players
Bundesliga players
Germany youth international footballers
American people of German descent
German people of American descent
Sportspeople of American descent
Association football defenders
Footballers from Berlin